Park Se-young (born July 30, 1988) is a South Korean actress. She rose to fame in 2012 with supporting roles in the television dramas Faith and School 2013. Park has since played leading roles in Sincerity Moves Heaven (2013) and Glorious Day (2014), as well as the film The Cat Funeral (2015).

Career
Park Se-young made her acting debut in a TV drama in 2002 when she was still a child, but left show business to concentrate on her studies. She returned to acting in 2011, and first drew attention after appearing in Jay Park's "Know Your Name (Acoustic)" music video. She then played supporting roles in family drama If Tomorrow Comes, revenge thriller Man from the Equator, melodrama Love Rain, period epic Faith, and teen drama School 2013.

In 2013, Park was cast in her first leading role in the daily drama Sincerity Moves Heaven (also known as A Tale of Two Sisters). She was also designated as one of the MCs on Music Bank.

Park appeared on the fourth season of We Got Married in 2014, a variety/reality show that paired celebrities into fake wedded couples (Park's partner was Jang Wooyoung from boyband 2PM). Another leading role followed in weekend drama Glorious Day. Park then starred in two webtoon film adaptations – Fashion King (2014) and The Cat Funeral (2015).

After ending a contract dispute with S.A.L.T Entertainment, Park signed with new agency Hunus Entertainment in 2015. The same year Park was cast in her villainous role in the daily drama My Daughter, Geum Sa-wol and she won Excellence Award, Actress in 9th Korea Drama Awards for her performance.

In 2016, Park starred in the medical thriller A Beautiful Mind.

After a supporting role in the 2017 legal thriller Whisper, Park played the leading role in melodrama Money Flower.

In June 2018, Park signed with new agency CL& Company.

In 2019, Park was cast in the comedy drama Special Labor Inspector as a judo athlete turned civil servant.

In 2022, Park is confirmed to make her small screen comeback after three years through tvN drama Mental Coach Jegal, for which she was cast along with Jung Woo, Lee Yoo-mi and Kwon Yul.

Personal life 
On January 24, 2022, Park’s agency confirmed that she and Kwak Jung-wook are getting married in mid-February, and the wedding ceremony will be held privately in Seoul. They met while appearing together in the drama School 2013 and developed into a couple a few years ago.

Filmography

Television series

Film

Variety show

Music video

Discography

Awards and nominations

References

External links
 
  
 
 
 

1988 births
Living people
South Korean child actresses
South Korean television actresses
South Korean film actresses
People from Seoul